George Feifer (September 8, 1934 – November 12, 2019) was an American journalist, novelist, and historian. Known for his autobiographical novels chronicling life in the Soviet Union, he also wrote three books on the Battle of Okinawa. His novel The Girl from Petrovka was adapted into a film starring Goldie Hawn.

He was born in Paterson, New Jersey in 1934, and lived in Manhattan before moving to Passaic, New Jersey with his mother and attending Passaic High School, where he edited the school's newspaper. He attended Harvard College.

Feifer died in Los Angeles, California in 2019.

Bibliography
 Justice in Moscow (1964)
 The Girl from Petrovka (1971)
 Moscow Farewell (1977)
 Tennozan: The Battle of Okinawa and the Atomic Bomb (1994)
 Breaking Open Japan: Commodore Perry, Lord Abe, and American Imperialism in 1853 (2006)
 The Battle of Okinawa: The Blood and the Bomb (2011)

References 

1934 births
2019 deaths
20th-century American translators
21st-century American translators
20th-century American novelists
21st-century American novelists
20th-century American journalists
21st-century American journalists
Passaic High School alumni
People from Passaic, New Jersey
Writers from Paterson, New Jersey
Novelists from New Jersey
Journalists from New Jersey
Juilliard School alumni
Harvard College alumni
Columbia University alumni
Moscow State University alumni
CBS News people